College of the Sacred Heart may refer to:

 A former name of Regis University, Denver, Colorado
 A former name of Manhattanville College, Purchase, New York
Baradene College of the Sacred Heart, Auckland, New Zealand
Campion College of the Sacred Heart, former name of Campion High School (1880-1975), Prairie du Chien, Wisconsin
Newton College of the Sacred Heart, Newton Centre, Massachusetts

See also
Sacred Heart College (disambiguation)
Sacred Heart (disambiguation)